Thrigby is a village and former civil parish  east of Norwich, now in the parish of Mautby, in the Great Yarmouth district, in the county of Norfolk, England. In 1931 the parish had a population of 47.

Amenities 
It has a church called St Mary. Thrigby Hall Wildlife Gardens are on Filby Road. Thrigby Windmill is 1 mile east of the village.

History 
The name "Thrigby" is Old Scandinavian and means 'Thrykki's farm/settlement'. Thrigby was recorded in the Domesday Book as Trikebei/Trukebei. On 1 April 1935 the parish was abolished and merged with Mautby.

References 

Villages in Norfolk
Former civil parishes in Norfolk
Borough of Great Yarmouth